Acodus is an extinct genus of conodonts.

Species 

 A. acutus
 A. campanula
 A. crassus
 A. delicatus
 A. deltatus
 A. erectus
 A. firmus
 A. jonesi
 A. kechikaensis
 A. neodeltatus
 A. oneotensis
 A. planus
 A. primitivus
 A. sigmoideus
 A. similaris
 A. tripterolobus A. zeballus Distribution 
Fossils of Acodus'' have been found in Argentina, Canada (Ontario, Quebec, British Columbia, Northwest Territories, Nunavut), China, Colombia (Tarqui, Huila), the Czech Republic, Estonia, Iran, Kazakhstan, Malaysia, the Russian Federation, Spain, Sweden, Thailand, the United Kingdom, and the United States (Indiana, New York, Tennessee, Nevada, Kentucky, Missouri, Ohio, Utah).

References

Bibliography

External links 

 

Conodont genera
Ordovician first appearances
Devonian extinctions
Ordovician animals of Asia
Ordovician animals of Europe
Ordovician animals of North America
Ordovician Canada
Ordovician United States
Ordovician animals of South America
Ordovician Argentina
Ordovician Colombia
Fossils of Colombia
Fossil taxa described in 1856
Paleozoic life of Ontario
Paleozoic life of the Northwest Territories
Paleozoic life of Nunavut
Paleozoic life of Quebec